Spell is a 2020 American supernatural horror thriller film directed by Mark Tonderai and starring Omari Hardwick and Loretta Devine. It was released in the United States through digital on October 30, 2020 by Paramount Pictures via Paramount Players.

Plot
While flying to his father's funeral in rural Appalachia Kentucky, an intense storm causes Marquis to lose control of the plane carrying himself and his family. He soon awakens wounded, alone and trapped in Ms. Eloise's attic. Eloise claims she can nurse him back to health with a hoodoo figure she's made from his blood and skin. Unable to call for help, Marquis desperately tries to break free from her dark magic and save his family from a sinister ritual before the rise of the blood moon.

Cast
Omari Hardwick as Marquis T. Woods
Loretta Devine as Ms. Eloise
John Beasley as Earl
Lorraine Burroughs as Veora Woods
Hannah Gonera as Samsara Woods
Kalifa Burton as Tydon Woods
Tumisho Masha as Sheriff
Steve Mululu as Lewis

Production
The film was shot in South Africa.

Release
The film was released on digital platforms on October 30, 2020. It was originally scheduled to be released theatrically on August 28, 2020 before it was pulled from the schedule due to the COVID-19 pandemic. It was later rescheduled to be released on home media on October 30, 2020. It was distributed by Paramount Players via the studio's parent company Paramount Pictures.

Reception
The site's critics consensus reads, "Despite a promising beginning, this repetitive and predictable thriller lacks enough of an identity to cast much of a Spell." Metacritic reports a score of 38 out of 100 based on six critic reviews, indicating "generally unfavorable reviews".

Tomris Laffly of RogerEbert.com awarded the film one and a half stars.  Meagan Navarro of Bloody Disgusting awarded the film one and a half skulls out of five.

Peter Debruge of Variety gave the film a positive review and wrote, "this is a decently stylish thriller with occult elements that should satisfy viewers’ genre requirements, though few will demand a second watch (or sequel)."

Frank Scheck of The Hollywood Reporter gave the film a negative review and wrote, "Unfortunately, the filmmaker's stylistic efforts aren't enough to compensate for the predictable, cliché-ridden aspects of the screenplay..."

References

External links
 
 

2020 direct-to-video films
2020 films
American thriller films
Films about aviation accidents or incidents
Films about Voodoo
Films directed by Mark Tonderai
Films not released in theaters due to the COVID-19 pandemic
Films shot in South Africa
Films with screenplays by Kurt Wimmer
Paramount Pictures films
Paramount Players films
2020 horror thriller films
2020s supernatural horror films
2020s English-language films
2020s American films